National Council elections were held in the Czech part of Czechoslovakia on 5 and 6 June 1992, alongside federal elections. The result was a victory for the Civic Democratic Party-Christian Democratic Party alliance, which won 76 of the 200 seats. Voter turnout was 85.0%. When the Czech Republic became independent in 1993, the National Council became its Parliament.

Campaign
Campaign of the Civic Democratic Party revolved around its leader Václav Klaus. The party used slogan "Future is in your hands. The whole campaign cost over 100 million CZK. It is described as very massive.

Finances

Opinion polls

Results

References

Czech
Legislative elections in Czechoslovakia
Elections to the Chamber of Deputies of the Czech Republic
Czech